Madison Township is one of the sixteen townships of Scioto County, Ohio, United States.  The 2010 census counted 4,106 people in the township.

Geography
Located in the northeastern corner of the county, it borders the following townships:
Marion Township, Pike County - north
Scioto Township, Jackson County - northeast
Hamilton Township, Jackson County - east
Union Township, Pike County - southeast
Bloom Township - south
Harrison Township - west
Jefferson Township - northwest

No municipalities are located in Madison Township, although the unincorporated communities of Minford and Mule Town lie along the border with Harrison Township and in the township's southwest respectively.

Name and history
Named after James Madison, the fourth President of the United States, it is one of twenty Madison Townships statewide.

Madison Township was settled as early as 1797 and was organized in 1810.

In 1833, Madison Township had one gristmill propelled by horses, and two tanyards.

Government
The township is governed by a three-member board of trustees, who are elected in November of odd-numbered years to a four-year term beginning on the following January 1. Two are elected in the year after the presidential election and one is elected in the year before it. There is also an elected township fiscal officer, who serves a four-year term beginning on April 1 of the year after the election, which is held in November of the year before the presidential election. Vacancies in the fiscal officership or on the board of trustees are filled by the remaining trustees.

References

External links
County website

Townships in Scioto County, Ohio
Townships in Ohio